Boost Capital is an alternative finance company based in the United Kingdom which provides business loans and merchant cash advances to small and medium-sized enterprises (SMEs). The company's owned by BFS Capital, which provides similar funding options to SMEs in the United States and Canada.

History 

In 2012, Boost Capital launched a £10 million fund to support the growth of small businesses in Yorkshire, including retailers, hotels and restaurants.

In 2014, Boost Capital conducted research which found that sectors dominated by small business, such as manufacturing and construction, were struggling to access finance. The research found that those industries lost a greater share of GDP than other sectors.

In March 2017, Boost Capital relocated to a new office in Chelmsford. Commenting on the move, managing director Alex Littner said: "We have always seen Chelmsford as a good location. Its proximity to London, but without the costs associated, gives us access to a high quality workforce."

In December 2017, BFS Capital announced that they along with Boost Capital had provided over $1.7 billion to SMEs across the UK, US and Canada since they started.

Products 
Boost Capital provide small business loans and merchant cash advances, both of which are forms of unsecured lending. They provide funding from £3,000.

Awards and recognition 

Boost Capital were named as finalists in the British Bank Awards 2018 in two categories, 'Best Business Finance Provider' and 'Best Alternative Finance Provider'.

They were shortlisted as 'SME Lender of the Year' in the 2018 Credit Awards.

Boost Capital was awarded ‘Highly Commended’ in the ‘Best Alternative Business Funding Provider” in the Business Moneyfacts Awards 2018. They're also finalists in three categories in the Money Business Moneyfacts Awards 2019 - 'Best Franchise Banking Provider', "Best Alternative Business Funding Provider' and 'Best Service from an Alternative Funding Provider'.

References

External links 
Boost Capital (company website)
BFS Capital (parent company website)

Financial services companies of the United Kingdom
Companies based in Chelmsford
Financial services companies established in 2012
2012 establishments in the United Kingdom
British companies established in 2012